Bördeaue is a municipality in the district of Salzlandkreis, in Saxony-Anhalt, Germany. It was formed on 1 January 2010 by the merger of the former municipalities Unseburg and Tarthun.

References

Salzlandkreis